Limon (Aslan) Staneci (1916–1991) was a journalist born in Stanec, Preševo in the Karadak Mountains of Yugoslavia.

Early life 

Staneci studied at the Faculty of Law at the University of Belgrade. He became the deputy secretary and sub-professor of Gjilan, secretary of the Regional Committee of the Second League of Prizren, Deputy secretary and sub-professor.

He was responsible for information in the context of organizing Freedom "League Second of Prizren" on the eastern front and preparing military reports from the front lines for fighting for the protection of territories in Eastern Kosovo's Newspaper Freedom" Second League of Prizren".

He was elected Deputy Secretary of Nënprefekturës Presevo. He served as secretary to Mullah Idriz Hajrullahu, judges and Head of Gjilan.

After the war he remained in Karadak, but after the suppression of resistance to release of Albanian Lands, as submitted on 20 March 1947.

Conviction 
Serb witnesses accused him of more than 20 murders of exiles and deportations along with Anti-Communist activities after World War II in Gjilan. He declared that he had stayed faithful to his patriotic duties. The District Court in Gjilan, headed by the Russian Zaharije on 6 October 1947 sentenced him to death by firing squad. However, the Presidium of SFRY's Assembly on 13 August 1947, changed his death sentence to 20 years imprisonment.

References

1916 births
1991 deaths
University of Belgrade alumni
Albanian collaborators with Nazi Germany
Yugoslav journalists